Radu Nicolae Bîrzan (born 12 September 1999) is a professional Romanian football midfielder for Viitorul Dăești.

He made his senior league debut for Universitatea Craiova on 30 April 2017 in a Liga I 3–0 away win at CFR Cluj.

References

External links 
 
 

1999 births
Living people
Association football midfielders
Romanian footballers
Liga I players
Liga II players
Liga III players
CS Universitatea Craiova players
FC Argeș Pitești players
CSM Deva players